Ishratul Ibad Khan (born 2 March 1963) is a politician who served as the 30th Governor of Sindh, Pakistan. lbad is a Pakistan-born citizen He took up the post of Governor of Sindh, Pakistan on 27 December 2002, becoming the youngest governor to hold the office. After a fight with his cousin Dr Mohsin(Uncle),on 16 July 2008, he became the province's longest-serving governor. He resigned on 27 June 2011, but his resignation was not accepted by the President of Pakistan. He resumed his official Governor duties from Tuesday, 19 July 2011. On 9 November 2016, he was removed as Governor of Sindh and replaced by Saeeduzzaman Siddiqui.

Political career
Ibad studied in Dow Medical College, Karachi. During his studies, he emerged as a leader of a student organisation, APMSO, a student wing of the Muttahida Qaumi Movement (MQM). After graduation, he remained the head of the Medical Aid Committee of MQM. Earlier in 1990, he was Minister of Housing and Town Planning in the Government of Sindh. Subsequently, he was assigned the additional portfolio of Environment and Public Health Engineering Departments. In 1993, he left for the United Kingdom on political asylum, where he acquired British nationality during his stay in northwest London.

Expulsion from MQM
On 22 April 2015, the chief of MQM Altaf Hussain delinked Ibad from the party and asked his party workers not to expect any relief and cooperation from Ishratul Ibad Khan. Under the Constitution of Pakistan, the Governor of a province, as the representative of the President, must remain apolitical and neutral thus cannot be associated with or be a member of any political party. fake

Links with Establishment 
An Urdu column published in the Daily Jang claims that Ishrat ul Ibad had practically become 'Pindi Boy' in 2011 and was very close with General Raheel Shareef. Ibad knew that his Governorship would be soon replaced after Raheel's retirement . He admitted in his interview that one cannot rule in Pakistan without serving the military establishment.

Achievements and developments
Ishrat-ul-Ebad played a key role in defusing tension and violence in the province by holding political talks with members of other political parties. He was also involved in securing the release of 22 hostages from Somalian pirates, with the partnership of Ansar Burney who leads a human rights organisation.

A number of development projects were started during Ebad's time in the office, including Nagan Chowrangi flyover. He is working on a long-term project to make Karachi a greener city. The Beach View Park was constructed under his supervision. It was a part of the Grand Recreation Project.

Also, under his supervision, a park Bagh Ibne Qasim (old name Jehangir Kothari Park near Jehangir Kothari Parade) was constructed, located in Clifton, Karachi, Sindh, Pakistan. This park replaced the former Toyland Theme Park. The park cost PKR 600 million and was completed in around 310 working days. It is estimated that more than 10 million people visit the park per year. Prior to the initiation of construction on Bagh Ibne Qasim,  of land was acquired from property speculators.

References

External links 
 Official Website – Governor of Sindh

1963 births
Living people
Pakistani emigrants to the United Kingdom
Naturalised citizens of the United Kingdom
Governors of Sindh
Muhajir people
Muttahida Qaumi Movement politicians
Politicians from Karachi
Dow Medical College alumni